Beat Em Up,  is the thirteenth studio album by American rock singer Iggy Pop. Recorded at Hit Factory Criteria studios in Miami Beach, Florida, it is the first Iggy Pop album in which the Trolls were credited. The Trolls were: Iggy Pop, Whitey Kirst, Pete Marshall, Alex Kirst and Lloyd "Mooseman" Roberts.

Background 
'Art Collins, Pop's manager, said of the album: "I'm not saying this is another Raw Power, but if Raw Power is a true Iggy album, then this is another true Iggy album". He added there would be some "ranting on the album, some humor, some rock on it." The album was self-produced.

Release 

The album was released on June 18, 2001, and included as an unmentioned bonus the song acknowledged as "Sterility" on tour playlists, featured right after "VIP".

Reception and aftermath

Reception 

Pitchfork was largely dismissive of the record, proclaiming its content "third-rate bar band stuff". Several critics noted the similarity of the album to the nu metal bands of the time.

Aftermath 
"Mask" was included on the compilation A Million in Prizes: The Anthology. The murder by drive-by shooting of bassist Lloyd 'Mooseman' Roberts, a former member of Ice-T's Body Count and a member of the Trolls at the time of his death, postponed plans to tour, though "Mask" was performed to great effect on the Late Show with David Letterman.

Track listing 
All songs composed by Iggy Pop and Whitey Kirst, except where indicated.
Track 15 (7:10 + 1:01 silence + 4:59) features a hidden track, "Sterility".

 "Mask" (Iggy Pop, Lloyd "Mooseman" Roberts, Alex Kirst, Whitey Kirst) – 2:53
 "L.O.S.T." – 3:24
 "Howl" – 5:05
 "Football" – 3:52
 "Savior" – 4:37
 "Beat Em Up" – 4:26
 "Talking Snake" – 4:28
 "Jerk" – 3:44
 "Death is Certain" – 4:38
 "Go for the Throat" (Pop, Mooseman, Kirst, Kirst) – 3:56
 "Weasels" – 2:59
 "Drink New Blood" – 4:33
 "It's All Shit" – 4:57
 "Ugliness" – 5:37
 "V.I.P." (Pop, Mooseman, Kirst, Kirst) – 15:31

B-sides and alternate versions 
 "Mask" (Single edit) – 2:53

Personnel 
 Iggy Pop – vocals

The Trolls
 Whitey Kirst – guitar
 Pete Marshall – guitar
 Alex Kirst – drums
 Lloyd "Mooseman" Roberts – bass

with:
Danny Kadar – theremin on "L.O.S.T.", mix engineer, mixing
Pete Marshall – rhythm guitar on "Ugliness"
Todd James – cover illustration

Charts

References

External links 

 

2001 albums
Iggy Pop albums
Virgin Records albums